"Everything Happens to Me" (1940) is a pop standard written by Tom Adair (lyrics) and Matt Dennis (music). It was first recorded by the Tommy Dorsey Orchestra featuring Frank Sinatra. Unusually, the song focused on Sinatra's vocal, with no trombone solo by Dorsey. Years later, Sinatra rerecorded the song with the Hollywood String Quartet; this version was featured on his 1957 album Close to You.

Notable versions
Chet Baker – (Chet Baker Sings) It Could Happen to You (1958)
June Christy – A Friendly Session, Vol. 1 (2000) with the Johnny Guarnieri Quintet, Cool Christy (2002)
Rosemary Clooney
Duke Jordan - Flight to Denmark (1990) 
Nat King Cole
Bill Evans – Trio 64
Clare Fischer – Alone Together (recorded 1975, released 1977 in Germany by MPS Records, and in the US by Discovery Records in 1980). Speaking with the Los Angeles Times in 1986, the composer - himself a popular singer-pianist who counted Fischer as one of his major influences - called this solo piano rendition "fantastic".
Ella Fitzgerald with the Frank De Vol orchestra – Hello, Love (1960)
Erroll Garner
Stan Getz – At Storyville (1951) 
Tom Harrell – Live at the Village Vanguard (2002)
Billie Holiday recorded the song with Her Orchestra in New York City on February 14, 1955.  Her orchestra consisted of Charlie Shavers on trumpet, Tony Scott on clarinet, Budd Johnson on tenor saxophone, Carl Drinkard on piano, Billy Bauer on guitar, Leonard Gaskin on bass, and Cozy Cole on drums.
Gerry Mulligan – Presenting the Gerry Mulligan Sextet (1956)
Stan Kenton – Stompin' At Newport (1957), At the Rendezvous Vol.2 (2000)
Karin Krog and Jacob Young – Where Flamingos Fly  (2002)
Julie London – Julie...At Home (1962). Al Viola on acoustic guitar 
Branford Marsalis – Bloomington (1991)
Mina – Mina (1964), 12 (American Song Book) (2012)
Thelonious Monk – Solo Monk (1965)
Charlie Parker – Charlie Parker with Strings (1949)
Art Pepper – Live At Donte's (1968)
Sonny Rollins – Sonny Rollins on Impulse! (1965)
Massimo Urbani – The Blessing (1993)
Neil Sedaka
Uri Caine and Paolo Fresu – Things (2006)
Jacky Terrasson – Mirror (2007)
The Giants of Jazz (1971)
Frank Sinatra – Close to You (1957)
Matt Dennis recorded the song on Plays and Sings Matt Dennis, a live performance featuring Dennis on vocals and piano. Dennis added a comedy second verse that began with the line: "I tried to sing a song but the conversation flowed". The trio paused abruptly, revealing the usual din of nightclub conversation, followed by appreciative laughter. (1958)
 Vince Jones – On the Brink of It (1985)
 Joe Pass – Meditacio (1992)
 Timothée Chalamet – A Rainy Day in New York, directed by Woody Allen (2019)
 Goofy (Bill Farmer) - The MousePack - Mickey and Friends Singing Classic Standards'' (2022)

References

1940 songs
Songs written by Tom Adair
Songs with music by Matt Dennis
Ella Fitzgerald songs
Frank Sinatra songs
Rosemary Clooney songs
Nat King Cole songs
Billie Holiday songs